In geometry, a complex Lie group is a Lie group over the complex numbers; i.e., it is a  complex-analytic manifold that is also a  group in such a way  is holomorphic. A connected compact complex Lie group is precisely a complex torus (not to be confused with the complex Lie group ). Any finite group may be given the structure of a complex Lie group. A complex semisimple Lie group is a linear algebraic group.

The Lie algebra of a complex Lie group is a complex Lie algebra.

Examples 

A finite-dimensional vector space over the complex numbers (in particular, complex Lie algebra) is a complex Lie group in an obvious way.
A connected compact complex Lie group A of dimension g is of the form , a complex torus, where L is a discrete subgroup. Indeed, its Lie algebra  can be shown to be abelian and then  is a surjective morphism of complex Lie groups, showing A is of the form described.
  is an example of a surjective homomorphism of complex Lie groups that does not come from a morphism of algebraic groups. Since , this is also an example of a representation of a complex Lie group that is not algebraic.
 Let X be a compact complex manifold.
 Let K be a connected compact Lie group. Then there exists a unique connected complex Lie group G such that (i) , and (ii) K is a maximal compact subgroup of G. It is called the complexification of K. For example,  is the complexification of the unitary group. If K is acting on a compact Kähler manifold X, then the action of K extends to that of G.

Linear algebraic group associated to a complex semisimple Lie group 
Let G be a complex semisimple Lie group. Then G admits a natural structure of a linear algebraic group as follows: let  be the ring of holomorphic functions f on G such that  spans a finite-dimensional vector space inside the ring of holomorphic functions on G (here G acts by left translation).

References 

Lie groups
Manifolds